Luisa Bradshaw-White (born 9 December 1974) is an English actress.  Her roles on television include playing Tina Carter in EastEnders, Bad Girls, Holby City and This Life. She has also made appearances in Grange Hill, Birds of a Feather, The Bill and Doctors.

Career
Bradshaw-White played Maria Watts in the BBC children's programme Grange Hill (1991–1994). She went on to act in several other television programmes including The Brittas Empire (1997); London's Burning (2001), A Touch of Frost (1997), the ITV police drama The Bill (1995; 1996; 1997), Birds of a Feather (1997; 1998), and Lorna Rose in Bad Girls in 1999.

In 1996, she played Kira in the BBC drama This Life. Film credits include Wonderful World (1998), The Escort, A Friendship in Vienna and playing Evita (the Hostess) in Mauvaise Passe (1999). Other television credits include roles in Big Bad World (1999); Bad Girls (1999) and Meaningful Sex (2000). She played nurse Lisa Fox in the BBC hospital drama Holby City (2001–2005).

Stage credits include Godspell (2001), Solitary Confinement, The Shagaround and playing Lady Anne in Richard III (1998). In 1997, Bradshaw-White along with fellow This Life cast member Ramon Tikaram (who played Ferdy) were invited by Elton John to appear in his music video for the song "Something About the Way You Look Tonight". On 18 November 2013, Bradshaw-White made her first appearance in the BBC soap opera EastEnders as the younger sister of established character, Shirley Carter (Linda Henry). In October 2020, it was announced that she would be leaving the programme with her final scenes airing on 28 December 2020 when she was killed off by Gray Atkins (Toby-Alexander Smith).

Personal life
She is a vegetarian.

Filmography

Awards and nominations

References

External links

 
 

English television actresses
English stage actresses
1974 births
Living people
English LGBT actors
People from Eastcote
Actresses from London
People educated at Haydon School
English soap opera actresses
English lesbian actresses
20th-century English LGBT people
21st-century English LGBT people